Simoom, a strong, dry, dust-laden local wind in Sahara, Palestine, Jordan, Syria, and the Arabian Peninsula
 Caudron Simoun, a 1930s aircraft
 Simoun (TV series), a Japanese animated TV series and its manga adaptations featuring aircraft called Simoun
 Simoun, the false identity of Crisóstomo Ibarra, one of the main characters of El filibusterismo by José Rizal 
 Henri Simoun, Howard Rodman's pseudonym when working on The Six Million Dollar Man film adaptation
 , a Bourrasque-class destroyer
 Wibault 8 Simoun, a 1920s fighter aircraft

See also 
 Simoom (disambiguation)
 Simon (disambiguation)